Eliseu (born 1983), born Eliseu Pereira dos Santos, is a Portuguese football left-back

Eliseu may also refer to:

People
Eliseu Meifrèn (1857–1940), Spanish impressionist painter
Eliseu Visconti (1866–1944), Brazilian painter and cartoonist
Eliseu Padilha (born 1945), Brazilian politician
Eliseu (footballer, born 1952), full name Eliseu Martins Ramalho, Portuguese football midfielder
Eliseu Ganda (born 1968), Angolan sailor
Eliseu dos Santos (born 1976), Paralympic boccia player
Eliseu Cassamá (born 1994), Bissau-Guinean football right-back

Places
Dom Eliseu, municipality in Pará, Brazil
Eliseu Martins, municipality in Piauí, Brazil

See also
Elizeu
Eliseus